Cheppad is a scenic village near Haripad in  Alleppy District in Kerala State, India. It is about halfway between Kochi and Thiruvananthapuram on the National Highway 47 (now NH 66).

Etymology
Cheppad was known as "Cheppukadu" in ancient times; "cheppu" indicates a small container and "kadu" indicates a small forest.

Economy
Cheppad is turning into a town of the future with the already existing national thermal power station, modernisation of Cheppad railway station and 5-star hotels in the neighbourhood. Cheppad is covered by the state of the art 3G mobile network and high speed broadband up to 8 Mbit/s and the new National Highway 66 development gives Cheppad access to all major cities.
Cheppad has a railway station too. There is a Government Ayurveda Hospital with very well qualified doctors 24 hours a day.

Demography
Cheppad is inhabited by a predominantly Hindu community. The Christian community is the second largest religious community and many denominations of Christian faith can be found here. There is no documentary evidence to establish the arrival of Christian community to this place. St. George Orthodox Church, Cheppad under the Malankara Orthodox Syrian church is the major attraction of cheppad.

St George Orthodox Church

St. George Orthodox Church in Cheppad is popularly known as Cheppad Valiya Pally, and is a pilgrim center of the Malankara Orthodox Church. The church may date from 1175. St George Orthodox Church is the resting place of Cheppad Philipose Mar Dionysius, Malankara Metropolitan of the Malankara Orthodox Syrian Church from 1825 to 1855. The 900-year-old mural paintings in Cheppad St. George Orthodox Church exhibits the Christian traditional paintings. The paintings are on the walls of the Madbaha (altar) of the Church and show events from the life of Jesus Christ from birth to ascension and few events from the old testament.

See also
Cheppad Mar Dionysios IV of the East

References

External links

 Article about Cheppad St George Church
 St. George Jacobite Syrian Orthodox Church

 
Villages in Alappuzha district